The Ephraim Fitz-Randolph House is a historic house located in the Randolphville section of Piscataway, New Jersey. It was added to the National Register of Historic Places on March 14, 1973.

See also
Randolphville Bridge

References

External links

National Register of Historic Places in Middlesex County, New Jersey
Houses on the National Register of Historic Places in New Jersey
Piscataway, New Jersey
Houses in Middlesex County, New Jersey
New Jersey Register of Historic Places
Historic American Buildings Survey in New Jersey
Houses completed in 1825